The 1946 New South Wales Rugby Football League premiership was the thirty-ninth season of Sydney’s top-level rugby league competition, Australia’s first. Eight teams from across the city contested during the season which culminated in Balmain’s victory over St. George in the premiership final.

Season summary
The South Sydney club did not win a single match in 1946, continuing a losing streak that started in round 8, 1945 and which would run till round 1, 1947.

Eastern Suburbs’ Lionel Cooper took out the New South Wales “Player of the Year” award.

Teams
 Balmain, formed on January 23, 1908, at Balmain Town Hall
 Canterbury-Bankstown
 Eastern Suburbs, formed on January 24, 1908, at Paddington Town Hall
 Newtown, formed on January 14, 1908
 North Sydney, formed on February 7, 1908
 South Sydney, formed on January 17, 1908, at Redfern Town Hall
 St. George, formed on November 8, 1920, at Kogarah School of Arts
 Western Suburbs, formed on February 4, 1908

Ladder

Finals
With just two rounds remaining, Newtown looked on track for the minor premiership until they lost to Eastern Suburbs and then Balmain in the two final rounds of the year. This left St. George to take the minor premiership, and with it, a guaranteed place in a final. This proved costly for Newtown, who were narrowly beaten by Canterbury-Bankstown in the semifinal eliminator, meaning they were out of the competition. St. George also lost their first round match, meaning they immediately got sent into the Grand final against the winner of a Balmain and Canterbury-Bankstown match, which Balmain won by a point.

Grand Final

In spite of St George’s status as minor premiers, Balmain were Grand Final favourites due to their comprehensive routing of the Dragons in the first semi-final. The decider, played on Saturday 14 September, was a closely fought contest.

A series of dubious decisions by referee George Bishop gave Balmain an advantage. There was a disallowed try to St George and two Balmain tries which came off what appeared to be forward passes, one when Balmain’s Joe Jorgenson scored after receiving a ball that seemed to have been propelled at least a yard forward.

The Dragons came close to victory when late in the game Jack Lindwall scored in the corner but his brother, prospective Test bowler, Ray Lindwall was unable to convert it. Lindwall in fact missed all four conversion attempts on the day.

The Tigers had won seven straight victories to take the premiership.

Tensions of the encounter overflowed after full-time, and at the conclusion of the match Saints forward, Jim Hale went toe to toe with Balmain hooker, Herb Gilbert, Jr, himself a former Dragon. Hale was then attacked by a spectator and an all-in brawl followed.

Balmain 13 (Tries: Jorgenson 2, Patton.  Goals: Bourke 2 )

defeated

St George 12 (Tries: J Lindwall 2, Jones, Munn)

Player statistics
The following statistics are as of the conclusion of Round 14.

Top 5 point scorers

Top 5 try scorers

Top 5 goal scorers

References

External links
 Rugby League Tables - Notes AFL Tables
 Rugby League Tables - Season 1946 AFL Tables
 Premiership History and Statistics RL1908
 Finals lineups and results Hunterlink site
 Results: 1941-1950 at rabbitohs.com.au
 1946 Labor Daily Cup at rleague.com
 NSWRFL season 1946 at rugbyleagueproject.org

New South Wales Rugby League premiership
NSWRFL season